Christopher Dunn (born February 19, 1998) is an American football placekicker for the NC State Wolfpack.

Early life and high school
Dunn grew up in Lexington, North Carolina and attended North Davidson High School. He finished his high school career with 271 points scored after making 30-of-48 field goal attempts and 175-of-194 extra points.

College career
Dunn became the NC State Wolfpack's primary kicker entering his freshman season and was named second team All-Atlantic Coast Conference (ACC) after he set school-records with 23 field goals made and 120 points scored. He repeated as a second team All-ACC selection after making 21 field goals on 24 attempts as a sophomore. He elected to use the extra year of eligibility granted to college athletes who played in the 2020 season due to the coronavirus pandemic and return to NC State for a fifth season. Dunn won the Lou Groza Award as the nation's best kicker in 2022, was a first team All-American, and set ACC records for most career points scored and field goals made. In NC State's bowl game, he made four field goals to break the career NCAA Division I FBS field goal leaders record.

References

External links
NC State Wolfpack bio

Living people
All-American college football players
American football placekickers
NC State Wolfpack football players
Players of American football from North Carolina
1998 births